Phtheochroides apicana is a species of moth of the family Tortricidae. It is found in Japan (Hokkaido to Kyushu) and the Kuril Islands. The habitat consists of fir-yew-broad-leaved forests.

References

Moths described in 1900
Cochylini